Krishna "Kesto" Pal (1934 – 14 October 2009) was an Indian footballer. He competed in the men's tournament at the 1956 Summer Olympics.

References

External links
 
 

1934 births
2009 deaths
Indian footballers
Footballers from Kolkata
Mohun Bagan AC players
India international footballers
Olympic footballers of India
Footballers at the 1956 Summer Olympics
Association football forwards
Calcutta Football League players